Paola Morán Errejón (born 25 February 1997) is a Mexican sprinter who specializes in the 400 metres. She won two medals at the 2019 Summer Universiade.

She finished 9th at the 2019 World Championships in Doha, Qatar.

International competitions

1Did not finish in the final

Personal bests
Outdoor
200 metres – 24.03 (+0.8 m/s, Monterrey 2017)
400 metres – 51.02 (Lima, Peru 2019)
400 metres hurdles – 56.55 (Chihuahua 2019)

References

1997 births
Living people
Mexican female sprinters
Athletes (track and field) at the 2014 Summer Youth Olympics
Athletes (track and field) at the 2015 Pan American Games
Athletes (track and field) at the 2019 Pan American Games
Pan American Games silver medalists for Mexico
Pan American Games medalists in athletics (track and field)
Universiade gold medalists in athletics (track and field)
Universiade gold medalists for Mexico
Universiade silver medalists for Mexico
Medalists at the 2017 Summer Universiade
Medalists at the 2019 Summer Universiade
Medalists at the 2019 Pan American Games
Athletes (track and field) at the 2020 Summer Olympics
Olympic female sprinters
Olympic athletes of Mexico
21st-century Mexican women